Over the Garden Wall is an American television series created by Patrick McHale for Cartoon Network.

Over the Garden Wall may also refer to:

 Over the Garden Wall (1919 film), a lost 1919 American film directed by David Smith
 Over the Garden Wall (1934 film), a British comedy film
 Over the Garden Wall (1950 film), a comedy sketch and 1950 feature film by British comedian Norman Evans